"Hold Me Up" is the debut solo single by Australian singer Conrad Sewell. It was released on 3 March 2015 and taken from his debut extended play, All I Know.

The song is co-written and co-produced by Sewell and Brian Lee (who has previously worked with Lady Gaga and Icona Pop), The Euroz and Louis Bell. 

The song was released in Australia on 3 March 2015 and peaked at number 39 on the ARIA Singles Chart.
The track was released in the United Kingdom on 24 July.
The remixes were released on 20 November.

Background
Sewell moved from Brisbane to Los Angeles to work on his music and in late 2014, provided the vocals on Kygo’s 2014 tropical house hit "Firestone".

On March 2, 2015 Sewell announced his opening slot on Ed Sheeran's 13-date Australian X tour throughout March and April via a video posted on his Facebook page. "Hold Me Up" was released the next day.

"Hold Me Up" emerged from a late-night, free-form session in the studio. Sewell said; "I’ve been doing this thing lately where I set up a mic live, put on some reverb so I feel like I’m singing in front of people, put on a track and just flow a melody over it. It’s been hard for me to get up-tempo songs, because I love nothing more than sitting at the piano and melting your heart—that’s definitely what I’ll tend to do in a writing situation. So when that one came, it was just a fun track that you can dance, drive, sing to, and we can worry about the serious stuff later."

Music video
The monochrome video features Sewell, chilling out and enjoying life down by the beach. The video was released on 12 May 2015.

Reviews
Mike Wass from Idolator said ‘Hold Me Up’ is a "soulful, vaguely disco-tinged pop anthem" and is a huge song with an instantly hummable chorus".

Madison Vain of Entertainment Weekly called the song "an upbeat, anthemic, just-about-impossible-to-not-get-swept-away-in pop track."

AuspOp said ‘Hold Me Up’ is "effortlessly cool, eternally optimistic, vocally impressive and filled with enough pop sunshine to brighten even the greyest of days."

Track listing

Charts

Weekly charts

Year-end charts

References

2015 singles
Conrad Sewell songs
Songs written by Brian Lee (songwriter)
2015 songs
Songs written by Louis Bell
Songs written by Conrad Sewell